Lam or LAM may refer to:

Organizations
 Laguna Art Museum, California, US
 Lam Eng Rubber, a Malaysian manufacturer
 Lam Research, American semiconductor equipment company
 LAM Mozambique Airlines, flag carrier airline of Mozambique
 Libraries, archives and museums; see GLAM (cultural heritage)
 Les Afriques dans le monde (LAM), a French academic research institute on Africa

Places
 Lam, Bavaria, Germany
 Lam Beshkest-e Pain, a village in Iran
 Lam Cốt, a village in Vietnam
 Lam, Guntur district, a village in Andhra Pradesh, India
 Lam Brook, a stream in England
 Los Alamos County Airport (IATA and FAA LID codes), US
 Monts de Lam, a department of Chad

Media
 London After Midnight (band)
 Lam saravane, a music genre
 Lam luang, a music genre
 Mor lam, an ancient Laotian form of song
 LAM (television program), Argentine entertainment program

Science and technology 
 Lactational amenorrhea method, a contraceptive method
 LAM/MPI, a Message Passing Interface
 Lymphangioleiomyomatosis, a lung disease
 Lipoarabinomannan, a tuberculosis virulence factor
 Laser capture microdissection or laser-assisted microdissection
 Cyclone Lam, Australia, 2015
 Lysine 2,3-aminomutase, an enzyme

People

Surnames
 Lin (surname) (林) (Cantonese: Lam) 
 Lâm, Vietnamese equivalent of Lin
 Lan (surname 蓝) (Cantonese and Hakka: Lam)

People with the surname

 Lam., botanical author abbreviation for Jean-Baptiste Lamarck (1744–1829)
 Adrian Lam (born 1970), Papua New Guinean-Australian rugby footballer
 Alfonso Lam Liu (born 1969/1970), Mexican drug lord
 Lam Bun (1930–1967), Hong Kong radio commentator
 Lam Bun-Ching (born 1954), Chinese musician
 Carrie Lam (politician) (born 1958), Hong Kong politician
 Carrie Lam (actress) (born 1980), Hong Kong television presenter
 David K. Lam (born 1943), Chinese-born American technology entrepreneur
 Lam Chi-chung (born 1976), Hong Kong actor
 Lam Chih Bing (born 1976), Singaporean golfer
 Lam Ching-ying (1952–1997), Hong Kong stuntman, actor, and action director
 Lam Chiu Ying (born 1949), SBS, Hong Kong meteorologist
 Gabriel Lam (born 1933), Catholic clergyman, Hong Kong
 George Lam (born 1947), Hong Kong singer
 Hai (video gamer) (born Hai Du Lam), American
 Hai Lam (footballer), Norwegian
 Lam Hin Chung, Hong Kong fencer
 Lam Ho Ching (born 1998), Hong Kong gymnast
 Lam Hok Hei (born 1991), Hong Kong footballer
 Jaffa Lam (born 1973), artist
 Lam Joi-pau (born 1950), Taiwanese actor
 Lam Jones (1958–2019), American athlete
 Jordan Lam (born 1999), Hong Kong footballer
 Lam Ka-Tung (born 1967), Hong Kong actor
 Lam Ka Wai (born 1985), Hong Kong footballer
 Lam Kam San (born 1971), Macanese racing driver
 Karena Lam (born 1978), actress in Hong Kong
 Narissapat Lam (born 1996), Thai badminton player
 Pakorn Lam (born 1979), Thai singer and actor
 Pat Lam (born 1968), Samoan-New Zealand rugby player
 Samantha Lam (singer) (born 1963), Hong Kong singer
 Sanderson Lam (born 1994), English snooker player
 Tsit Yuen Lam (born 1942), Chinese-American mathematician
 Tuan Lam (born 1966), poker player
 Wifredo Lam (born 1902), Cuban artist
 Zhi-Gin Lam (born 1991), German footballer

People with the given name
 Lam Adesina (1939–2012), educator in Nigeria
 Lam Akol (born 1950), South Sudanese politician
 Lam Dorji (born 1933), Royal Bhutan Army officer

Other uses
 Lām, a letter of the Arabic alphabet
 Lam Ieng, a Macau football club
 Lam, a supernatural entity according to Aleister Crowley
 On the lam (to be), an expression

See also
 
 
 Lam Chau, a former island, now Hong Kong International Airport
 Lam Kee Ferry, Hong Kong
 Lamb (disambiguation)
 Lamm, a surname
 Lams (disambiguation)